Song Jiaoren (Given name at birth: Liàn 鍊; Courtesy name: Dùnchū 鈍初) (5 April 1882 – 22 March 1913) was a Chinese republican revolutionary, political leader and a founder of the Kuomintang (KMT). Song Jiaoren led the KMT to electoral victories in China's first democratic election. He based his appeal on the upper class gentry, landowners, and merchants.  Historians have concluded that provisional president, Yuan Shikai, was responsible for his assassination on March 20, 1913.

Early life 
Song Jiaoren was born and educated in Hunan. When he was six years old, Song Jiaoren began his education at a private school. When Song was seventeen years old, he graduated and began enrollment at Taoyuan Zhangjiang College. The influence of his teachers, Huang Shouyi and Qu Fangmei, caused Song to make no effort to pursue the civil service examinations, and was he interested mainly in his time's world events and the counterculture. Song received excellent grades in college.

In August 1902, Song Jiaoren went to Wuchang to attend the Bishop Boone Memorial School (now the Central China Normal University), and in Wuchang, he met the revolutionary Huang Xing, and the two quickly became lifelong friends. Huang was soon forced to leave Wuchang due to his revolutionary activities, and returned to his hometown of Changsha. After Huang left, Song continued his organization of revolutionary groups in Hunan, especially in Changsha and Changde.

Later in 1902, Song was recruited to teach at the Wuchang Normal School, a prestigious private secondary school. Song arrived in Wuchang and began teaching in 1903. In Wuhan, Song became involved with various local revolutionary groups, including the Huaxinghui, a group of which he became vice president. However, the Wuchang Garden Hill Party especially appealed to him. Song often discussed politics and revolution with his students, many of whom were opposed to the idea of revolution.

Early involvement in Kuomintang 
Because of his revolutionary activities, Song in 1904 was forced to flee China for Japan, where he studied western political thought and made contacts among the expatriate Chinese student population and Japanese Pan-Asianists. During this period, Song was a close friend of the Japanese nationalist thinker Kita Ikki.

In 1905, together with Sun Yat-sen, Song helped to found and was a leading activist in the Tongmenghui, which was an organization dedicated to the overthrow of the Qing dynasty and the formation of a republic. Song returned to China in 1910 after the Xinhai Revolution and traveled to Hong Kong the next year to organize the Second Guangzhou Uprising. After the 1912 declaration of the Republic of China, Song helped to transform the Tongmenghui into the Kuomintang, also known as the KMT or Chinese Nationalist Party.

Song spoke out against the increasing authoritarianism of China's provisional president, Yuan Shikai, and expressed concerns towards Yuan's indications that he would like to restore a monarchical system to China with himself as emperor. On January 1, 1912, the Republic of China was established in Nanjing. Song was appointed to reform China's legal system, and he drafted a provisional constitution, the Republic of China Interim Government Organization Act.

First Chinese election campaign 
Song Jiaoren was only 30 when he was tasked by Sun Yat-sen to organize the Kuomintang for the 1912 Chinese democratic election campaign, the first in China. Song proved to be a naturally-skilled political organizer, but he had an arrogant self-confidence, which alienated many potential supporters. Only 10 percent of the adult males were allowed to vote, about 40 million in all, who were the gentry, landowners and middle-class merchants. They formed the political base of the new party. After the election, the Kuomintang won 269 of 596 seats in the House of Representatives and 123 of 274 seats in the Senate. Of the remaining seats, the majority were split between three rival parties, but over 300 small parties competed in the election. After the election, Song was widely regarded as a prime candidate for the position of prime minister.

One of Song's main political goals was to ensure that the powers and the independence of China's elected assemblies were properly protected from the influence of the office of the president. Song's goals in curtailing the office of the president conflicted with the interests of China's provisional president, Yuan Shikai. By mid-1912, clearly Yuan dominated over the provisional cabinet that he had named and was showing signs of a desire to hold overweening executive power. During Song's travels through China in 1912, he had openly and vehemently expressed the desire to limit the powers of the president in terms that often appeared openly critical of Yuan's ambitions.  When the results of the 1913 elections indicated a clear victory for the Kuomintang, Song appeared to be in a position to exercise a dominant role in selecting the prime minister and cabinet, and the party could have proceeded to push for the election of a future president in a proper parliamentary setting.

Assassination 
On March 20, 1913, while traveling with a group of colleagues to the Parliament in Beijing, Song Jiaoren was shot twice at close range at the Shanghai Railway Station by a lone gunman, Wu Shiying who had been contracted by Ying Guixin, a Shanghai underworld figure closely associated with the Yuan Shikai regime. Song died two days later in hospital. The trail of evidence led to the secretary of the cabinet and the provisional premier of Yuan Shikai's government, Zhao Bingjun.  Although Yuan was considered by contemporary Chinese media sources the man most likely behind the assassination, the main conspirators investigated by authorities were themselves assassinated or disappeared mysteriously. Because of the lack of evidence, Yuan was never officially implicated. After an investigation revealed telegraphs implicating Ying Guixin in Song's assassination, Ying attempted to flee north, where Yuan could protect him, but was killed by two swordsmen while riding in a first-class train carriage. Zhao Bingjun was poisoned in 1914.

Legacy
The political climate in China degenerated soon after Song Jiaoren's assassination, eventually leading to the failed Second Revolution. Yuan Shikai ejected the Kuomintang from China's elected assemblies in 1913, dissolved parliament in 1914, declared himself emperor in 1915, and died in 1916. After the failure of China's first democratic system to achieve a stable government, the country descended into more than a decade of warlordism.

See also 
 History of the Republic of China

References

External links 
 The death of a revolutionary: The song of Song (The Economist, Dec 22nd 2012)

Republic of China politicians from Hunan
1882 births
1913 deaths
Chinese revolutionaries
Politicians from Changde
People of the 1911 Revolution
Chinese expatriates in Japan
Members of the Kuomintang
Tongmenghui members
Assassinated Chinese politicians
Sun Yat-sen
Political party founders
Central China Normal University alumni
Deaths by firearm in China
Hosei University alumni
Waseda University alumni
Burials in Shanghai